Events from the year 1845 in China.

Incumbents 
 Daoguang Emperor (25th year)

Viceroys
 Viceroy of Zhili — Nergingge
 Viceroy of Min-Zhe — 
 Viceroy of Huguang — 
 Viceroy of Shaan-Gan — ?
 Viceroy of Liangguang — 
 Viceroy of Yun-Gui — 
 Viceroy of Sichuan — 
 Viceroy of Liangjiang —

Events 
 British Concession (Shanghai) created by the 1845 Land Regulations
 a wave of Jewish immigration occurs to Shanghai

Births 
 Zhao Erfeng (1845–1911), courtesy name Jihe, was a Qing Dynasty official and Han Chinese bannerman, who belonged to the Plain Blue Banner. He is known for being the last amban in Tibet, appointed in March, 1908
 Li Rongfa (Chinese: 李容發) (1845–1891) was an eminent military leader of the Taiping Rebellion, and known during his military tenure as King of Zhong the second (忠二王)
 Wang Yirong (Chinese: 王懿榮; 1845–1900) was a director of the Chinese Imperial Academy, best known as the first to recognize that the symbols inscribed on oracle bones were an early form of Chinese writing
 Ma Jianzhong (Chinese: 馬建忠) (1845 Dantu, Jiangsu province –1900), courtesy name Meishu (眉叔), also known as Ma Kié-Tchong in French, was a Chinese official and scholar in the late Qing Dynasty
 Xu Jingcheng (Chinese: 許景澄; 1845 – 28 July 1900) was a Chinese diplomat and Qing politician supportive of the Hundred Days' Reform

References